"Southside" is a hit single of Houston rapper Lil' Keke on his debut album Don't Mess Wit Texas. The song was produced by Double D. A video was produced in 1998, directed by Marty Thomas, with the 'southside dance'. The song samples "Friends" by Whodini. There is also a remix made with Memphis rapper 8Ball on Lil' Keke's third album It Was All A Dream.

Charts

References

 
1997 singles
Lil' Keke songs